McMillan is an unincorporated community in the town of McMillan, Marathon County, Wisconsin, United States which was at one time an incorporated village.

History
A post office called McMillan was established in 1881, and remained in operation until it was discontinued in 1919. The community was named for B. F. McMillan, a businessperson in the lumber industry.

Notes

Unincorporated communities in Marathon County, Wisconsin
Unincorporated communities in Wisconsin